The Bologna Motor Show (known as the "Salone internazionale dell'auto e della moto di Bologna" in Italian) was an auto show which was scheduled to be held annually in December, in Bologna, Italy.  

The editions of 2009 and 2012 were the shortest events in its history, whereas the editions of 2013 and 2015 were not held, due to unfavourable economic conditions initially, and a lack of planning by new organizers and diminished interest by exhibitors, respectively. The edition of 2018 was also cancelled as well, with the format of the show completely changed by 2019.

As its name in Italian suggests, the Bologna Motor Show also plays the role of an annual Motorbike Exhibition, incorporating bicycle exhibitors for the first time in 1994.

Another highlight is its various motorsport competitions, which see the participation of leading drivers and motorbike riders. From 1988 to 1996, the main event was the Formula One Indoor Trophy, a Formula One single elimination competition, with competitors like Rubens Barrichello, Johnny Herbert, Gabriele Tarquini and Giancarlo Fisichella. From 1997 to 2007, it featured the Euro Formula 3000, with drivers like Thomas Biagi, André Lotterer and Marco Bonanomi.

2019 
The 44th Bologna International Motor Show of 2019 is now defunct, and converted to the show about virtual reality, driving simulators and video games.

2018 
The 43rd Bologna International Motor Show of 2018 did not take place, due to financial and logistical reasons.

2017 
The 42nd Bologna International Motor Show took place from December 2 to December 10, 2017.

2016 
The 41st Bologna International Motor Show took place from December 3 to December 11, 2016.

2015 
On 6 November 2015, it was announced that the 40th Bologna International Motor Show would not be held. Previously run by GL Events, the new organizer Bologna Fiere has arranged for the event to be part of the 2016 international calendar of the Organisation Internationale des Constructeurs d'Automobiles (OICA).

2014 
The 39th Bologna International Motor Show took place from December 6 to December 14, 2014.

2013 
On October 8, 2013, it was announced that the 38th Bologna International Motor Show had been cancelled, due to a lack of exhibitors caused by the general economic crisis in Europe.

2012 
The 37th Bologna International Motor Show took place from December 5 to December 9, 2012. This edition was akin to that held in 2009, affected by prevailing poor economic conditions.

2011 
The 36th Bologna International Motor Show took place in BolognaFiere, Bologna, Italy from December 3 to December 11, 2011.

Presentations:
 Alfa Romeo Giulietta (LPG)
 Ferrari 599XX Evolution Package

2010 
The 35th Bologna International Motor Show took place from December 2 to December 4, 2010.

Presentations:
 DR1 Electric
 Ferrari 458 Challenge
 Opel Antara (facelift)
 Opel Corsa (facelift)
 Peugeot EX1 concept

2009 
The 34th Bologna International Motor Show was shortened to five days due to the overall crisis affecting the automotive industry at the time, and took place from December 4 to December 8, 2009.

Presentations:
 Mazda3
 Tazzari Zero

2008 
The 33rd Bologna International Motor Show took place from December 5 to December 14, 2008.

Presentations:
 Citroën C1
 Mazda3
 Opel Insignia
 Tata Indica Electric
 Volkswagen Golf Plus

2007 
The 32nd Bologna International Motor Show took place from December 7 to December 16, 2007. This edition of the show was the largest ever, featuring the highest number of exhibitors.

Presentations:
 Alfa Romeo 147 Ducati Edition
 Audi A3 Cabriolet
 Citroën C5
 Citroën C5 Airscape Concept
 Citroën Nemo Concept
 Ford Focus Style Wagon (facelift)
 Hummer H3 Black Edition
 Hyundai i10
 Mahindra Goa GLX 2.5 CRDe six seater (European launch)
 Mahindra Bolero 2.5 CRDe EURO4 single cab pickup (European launch)
 Mahindra Goa DX EURO4 (European launch)
 Mazda5 (facelift)
 Mitsubishi Lancer Evolution X (European launch)
 Opel Zafira (facelift)
 Peugeot Bipper Tepee Concept
 Porsche Boxster RS60 Spyder
 Renault Modus (facelift)
 Renault Grand Modus
 Martin Motors Bubble (European launch, licensed from Shuanghuan)
 Subaru Impreza STI N14 by Prodrive
 Subaru Impreza 2.5 STI AWD (European launch)
 Tata Ace Electric
 Tata Elegante concept (European launch)

2006 
The 31st Bologna International Motor Show took place from December 5 to December 17, 2006.

Presentations:
 Diesel Chevrolet Lacetti
 DR 3
 DR 5
 Fiat Panda Panda
 Ford C-Max (facelift)
 Great Wall Hover Limousine (European launch)
 Katay Gonow Troy (European launch)
 Katay Gonow Victory (European launch)
 Lamborghini Murciélago LP640 Roadster (European launch)
 Maserati MC12 Corsa
 MY2007 Opel Astra
 Martin Motors CEO (European launch, under licence by Shuanghuan)
 Škoda Roomster Scout
 Smart Fortwo
 SsangYong Actyon Sport SUT (European launch)
 Tata Indica 1.4 DICOR 16v
 Tata Indigo SW 1.4 DICOR 16v
 Tata Safari 2.2 DICOR
 Tata TL Sprint
 Toyota Auris (European launch)
 Volkswagen CrossTouran

2005 
The 30th Bologna International Motor Show took place from November to December 10, 2005.

Presentations:
 Ferrari F2005
 Ferrari FXX
 Fiat Panda Monster
 Fiat Sedici

2004 
The 29th Bologna International Motor Show took place from December 6 to December 14, 2004.

Presentations:
 Alfa Romeo 166 (facelift)
 Mercedes-Benz B-Class
 Mercedes-Benz CLS-Class (W219)
 Mitsubishi Grandis
 Škoda Octavia Wagon 4x4
 Volvo XC90 V8

2003 
The 28th Bologna International Motor Show took place from December 4 to December 14, 2003.

Presentations:
 Alfa Romeo 147 GTA Selespeed
 Citroën C3 X-Treme Concept
 Ferrari 360 GTC
 Kia KCD-I Slice Concept
 SEAT Altea Prototipo Concept
 Volvo V50

2002 
The 27th Bologna International Motor Show took place from December 8 to December 9, 2002.

Presentations:
 Alfa Romeo 156 GTAm
 Dodge Razor Concept
 Fiat Barchetta
 Fiat Doblò Sandstorm Concept
 Fiat Panda Simba
 Lancia Y Vanity
 Maserati Trofeo

2001 
The 26th Bologna International Motor Show took place from November to December 10, 2001.

Presentations:
 Alfa Romeo 156 GTA/Sportwagon GTA
 Audi A4 Convertible
 Audi S6
 Citroën C3
 Fiat Stilo
 Honda S2000
 Mercedes-Benz SL-Class (R230)
 Mini Cooper S
 Mitsubishi Pajero
 Mitsubishi Pajero Evolution concept
 Opel Signum2 Concept
 Peugeot 607
 SEAT Ibiza
 Subaru Impreza
 Volkswagen Polo
 Volkswagen W12 Concept

1999 

 Alfa Romeo Centauri Concept
Lamborghini Diablo GTR (race car)
 Town Life

1995 

 Lamborghini Diablo Roadster VT
 Maserati Ghibli Open Cup
 Volvo V40

1994 

 Alfa Romeo 146
 Audi A4
 Daewoo No.1 Concept
 Maserati Ghibli
 ODA Spider
 Škoda Felicia
 Zlatko Cosmopolit

This edition of the Motor Show saw the motorbike manufacturers exhibiting their products for the first time. Ducati thus took the opportunity to present their 916 Senna superbike, which Ayrton Senna himself had endorsed months prior to his fatal crash in May 1994. In addition, this edition also saw the inclusion of bicycle manufacturers and a kermesse competition with the participation of leading Italian professionals Gianni Bugno and Claudio Chiappucci.

References

External links

Auto shows in Italy
Automotive industry in Italy
Recurring events established in 1976
1976 establishments in Italy